This is a list of elevator accidents by death toll. It does not include accidents involving gondola lifts, ski lifts or similar types of cable transport.

List

Other notable accidents
 On 14 December 1883, in one of the earliest documented elevator accidents, a 15-year-old boy was decapitated by an elevator at a furniture warehouse in Baltimore, Maryland.
 On 20 May 1905, three elevator accidents occurred in New York City within the span of a few hours, killing two men and one woman.
 On 28 July 1945, a U.S. Army plane crashed into the Empire State Building in New York City, causing an elevator to fall 75 storeys (more than 300 meters or 1,000 feet). Elevator operator Betty Lou Oliver was injured but survived. It remains the Guinness World Record for the longest fall survived in an elevator.
 On 20 June 1973, former Australian member of parliament Dugald Munro was crushed to death in an elevator accident, aged 43. He was trapped between the lift cage and door in a building in Bridge Street, Sydney, and was unable to be freed.
 On May 14, 1986, WJJS news radio reporter Ron Lee Alexander was one of seven people who jumped off an elevator in the Allied Arts Building in Lynchburg, Virginia, after it stopped between the 5th and 6th floors. About 300 pounds, he was the last to jump. When he did, the car shot upward and he fatally stumbled backward into the shaft.
 On January 7, 1995, a man was decapitated by a malfunctioning elevator in New York City.
 In October 1999, a brief power dip caused an elevator to stop between the 13th and 14th floors at the McGraw-Hill Building in New York City, trapping Nicholas White, an employee of the building who was going down to take a cigarette break. Despite activating an alarm and the presence of a surveillance camera, nearly 41 hours passed before he was noticed and rescued. Years later, the surveillance video was made public.
On August 16 2003, Dr. Hitoshi Nikaidoh, a surgical resident at a Texas hospital, became trapped between the doors of a hospital elevator when faulty wiring caused them to suddenly close.  When the elevator rose, Nikaidoh's head was severed above the jaw.
 On May 24, 2003, a woman was beheaded in an accident with a cargo lift that occurred at a supermarket in Nerja, Malaga, Spain. The victim, a worker for a company in charge of cleaning the establishment, put the car with her tools in the cargolift and went to an upper floor to collect it by inserting her head into the elevator shaft, at the time of the accident. The Local Police tried to locate a client of foreign nationality who allegedly witnessed the accident and left the establishment, prey to an anxiety attack.
 On November 8, 2009, Jerry Fuchs was caught in a broken elevator in Williamsburg, Brooklyn, New York City. When assistance arrived and the doors were pried open, he attempted to jump out of the elevator car. Upon landing, his hood caught on something, pulling him off balance, and he accidentally fell to his death down the elevator shaft.
 In December 2011, an elevator in New York City suddenly ascended while Suzanne Hart, a director for an advertising agency, was boarding. She was crushed to death almost instantly. Investigations later revealed that the elevator was undergoing maintenance and was switched back to "automatic" mode while a jumper cable bypassed the safety circuits, resulting in the elevator ascending with the doors open.
 In April 2013, an elevator broke down at Hotel Eden in Bad Gastein, Austria, trapping the owner inside. He was rescued after four days.
 On 15 May 2013, a 24-year-old nurse was decapitated by an elevator at a hospital in Shenzhen, China. As she tried to exit the elevator on the third floor, it suddenly plunged down to the building's basement and caught her between the doors. Eleven other people were trapped inside and tried to free the woman, but it was too late. They were all rescued shortly after the gruesome incident.
 On August 3, 2013, Bob Reuter, a musician and host of the KDHX (88.1 FM) weekly radio program “Bob’s Scratchy Records,” died after falling down an elevator shaft while moving into a downtown loft. Police said he opened the door to the elevator, which is nearly 100 years old, and stepped into the shaft, falling an estimated 18 feet to his death.
 On 7 June 2014, 31-year-old José Vergara Acevedo was seriously injured at an apartment building in Providencia, Chile when an elevator he was riding soared up 31 floors in 15 seconds before crashing into the building's roof.
On 14 September 2014, a malfunctioning elevator in Xiamen, China ascended while a Huaqiao University student was getting inside, pinning him between the floor of the elevator and the top of its door frame. When Chinese authorities were able to remove him nearly half an hour later, he was pronounced dead, apparently having suffocated due to the force of the elevator against his body.
 On December 31, 2015, Stephen Hewett-Brown, an aspiring musician, pushed a woman out of a New York apartment building elevator as it slipped and pinned him between the ceiling of the car and the building’s third floor. He later died from his injuries.
 On 1 March 2016, a 43-year-old woman was found starved to death inside an elevator at an apartment building in the Chinese city of Xi’an. She was overlooked when maintenance men examined the broken elevator and cut off the power to it. When they returned more than a month later, the woman's body was found. The incident sparked outrage over the apparent negligence of the men, who were charged with involuntary manslaughter. At least one of them was detained.
 On 17 March 2017, an elevator plunged 4 floors (5th floor to basement floor) at Blok M Square in Jakarta after the cable snapped. Due to the incident, 25 people were injured.
 On 16 November 2018, an elevator plunged 84 floors (95th floor to 11th floor) at the 100-story John Hancock Center in Chicago after two of the cables holding the lift snapped, but no one was injured or killed.
 On 22 August 2019, 30-year-old Samuel Waisbren was crushed to death at an apartment building in New York City when the elevator which he was trying to exit suddenly descended. Five other people were trapped in the elevator and were later rescued by firefighters. One man had exited the elevator just before it gave way.
 On 14 September 2020, 38-year-old Boston University lecturer Carrie O'Connor was crushed to death at an apartment building in Boston when the elevator suddenly descended, trapping her in the doorway.

See also
 2006 Minato Ward elevator accident

References

Lists of disasters
Lists by death toll
Elevator accidents
Elevator